Errabelli Dayakar Rao is an Indian politician who is the current Minister for Panchayat Raj and Rural Development, Rural Water Supply for Telangana state and Member of the Telangana Legislative Assembly from Palakurthi constituency. He was the member of the Parliament of India. He was elected six times to Legislative Assembly.

Rao represents Palakurthi constituency of Warangal district in the Telangana Legislative Assembly. The state of Telangana came into being when Andhra Pradesh was bifurcated and prior to that time, Rao had been elected on several occasions from Wardhannapet constituency to the Andhra Pradesh Legislative Assembly.

Rao was also briefly a member of the 14th Lok Sabha for the Warangal constituency. He contested a by-election for the seat in June 2008 when numerous members of the Telangana Rashtra Samiti (TRS) resigned their seats in both the Parliament of India and the Andhra Pradesh Legislative Assembly in protest. He defeated the sitting TRS politician, Dharavathu Ravindra Naik, in the constituency.

In February 2016, Rao left the TDLP in favour of the TRS. He was at that time leader of the TDLP in the Assembly.

References 

 Living people
India MPs 2004–2009
 Telangana politicians
 People from Warangal
 Lok Sabha members from Andhra Pradesh
1956 births
Telangana MLAs 2018–2023